Dadagiri is a  1987 Bollywood action film directed by Deepak Shivdasani, starring Dharmendra, Govinda, Amrish Puri and Padmini Kolhapure. Dadagiri was successful movie of 1987 and this is the first movie where Dharmendra and Govinda performed together.

Plot 
Dharma helps an innocent young lady to retrieve her rightful property from her greedy uncle.

Cast
 Dharmendra as Dharma
 Govinda as Suraj
 Padmini Kolhapure as Barkha Singh
 Rati Agnihotri as Deepa Singh
 Amrish Puri as Bhanupratap Singh
 Shashikala as Shanti Singh
 Rakesh Bedi as Roshan Singh
 Sudhir Dalvi as Lawyer  Saxena
 Manik Irani as Raja Kaalia
 Shiva Rindani as Vicky, Roshan Friend
 Viju Khote as Lakhanpal
 Anup Jalota as Singing Fakeer
 Pooja Ghai Rawal as Adolscent Barkha
 Asha Patel as Chandni Singh

Music
"Aasman Se Zamin Pe Utara Hame Duniya Wale Zindgi" - Anup Jalota
"Jo Muskurahat Mujhe De Rahi Ho Wo Muskurahat" - Munmi Borah, Anu Malik
"Pataya Pataya Ek Ladki Ko Maine Pataya" - Shabbir Kumar
"Sirf Khiladee Badal Gaya" - Anuradha Paudwal
"Gudiya Rani Hai Tu" - Anuradha Paudwal, Munmi Borah
"Maa Meri Tu Kyon Mujhse" - Munmi Borah
"Sirf Khilaadi Badal Gayaa Baaki Khel Puraanaa Hai" - Anuradha Paudwal

References

External links
 
 

1987 films
1980s Hindi-language films
Films scored by Anu Malik
Indian action drama films
Films directed by Deepak Shivdasani